Crown Point is an unincorporated community in Jefferson Parish, Louisiana, United States.

Unincorporated communities in Jefferson Parish, Louisiana
Unincorporated communities in Louisiana